Jul, jul, strålande jul is a 1964 Christmas album by Ingvar Wixell with Hans Wahlgren's band. It was rerelased in 1993.

Track listing
Julsång (Cantique de Noel) - Adolphe Adam
När det lider mot jul (Det strålar en stjärna) - Ruben Liljefors, Jeanna Oterdahl
Det är en ros utsprungen (Es ist ein Ros entsprungen) - anonymous
I juletid - Gustaf Nordqvist, Paul Nilsson
Kom jul, med klara, vita ljus - Sven Skiöld, Karl-Erik Forsslund
Jul, jul, strålande jul - Gustav Nordqvist, Edvard Evers
Hosianna  - Georg Joseph Vogler
Det brinner en stjärna i Österland - David Wikander, Paul Nilsson
Stilla natt (Stille Nacht, Heilige Nacht) - Franz Gruber, Carl Oskar Malmström
Betlehems stjärna (Gläns över sjö och strand) - Alice Tegnér, Viktor Rydberg
Ett barn är fött på denna dag - trad.
Nu är det advent - Gustaf Nordqvist, Erik Natan Söderberg
Nu tändas tusen juleljus - Emmy Köhler
Gören portarna höga - Gunnar Wennerberg

References 

Ingvar Wixell albums
1964 Christmas albums
Christmas albums by Swedish artists
Classical Christmas albums